is a passenger railway station located in the city of Mitoyo, Kagawa Prefecture, Japan. It is operated by JR Shikoku and has the station number "Y15".

Lines
Mino Station is served by the JR Shikoku Yosan Line and is located 44.5 km from the beginning of the line at Takamatsu. Dosan line local, Rapid Sunport, and Nanpū Relay services stop at the station. In addition, there are two trains a day running a local service on the Seto-Ōhashi Line which stop at the station.

Layout
The station, which is unstaffed, consists of a side platform serving a single track. A small station building houses a waiting room and an automatic ticket vending machine. A ramp leads up to the platform from the waiting room. A bike shed is located nearby.

Adjacent stations

History
Mino Station opened on 27 January 1952 as an additional stop on the existing Yosan Line. At this time the station was named  and was operated by Japanese National Railways (JNR). With the privatization of JNR on 1 April 1987, control of the station passed to JR Shikoku. The station was renamed Mino Station on 3 December 1994.

Surrounding area
Mitoyo Chamber of Commerce and Industry
Mitoyo City Hall Mino Branch

See also
 List of railway stations in Japan

References

External links

 Station timetable

Railway stations in Kagawa Prefecture
Railway stations in Japan opened in 1952
Mitoyo, Kagawa